Talgat Sabalakov is a Kazakhstani midfielder. He plays for the club FC Caspiy in First Division.

Club career stats
Last update: 12 July 2012

Honours 
 Intertoto Cup Winner: 2007
 Kazakhstan League Runner-up: 2007, 2008
 Kazakhstan Cup Winner: 2007

References

1986 births
Living people
Association football midfielders
Kazakhstani footballers
FC Caspiy players
FC Kairat players
FC Tobol players
Kazakhstan international footballers
People from Aktau